Christie Chue May Mun Ee (born 3 July 2000) is a Singaporean swimmer. She competed in the women's 50 metre breaststroke at the 2019 World Aquatics Championships held in Gwangju, South Korea and she did not advance to compete in the semi-finals.

References

External links
 

2000 births
Living people
Singaporean female breaststroke swimmers
Place of birth missing (living people)
Swimmers at the 2018 Summer Youth Olympics
Competitors at the 2015 Southeast Asian Games
Competitors at the 2017 Southeast Asian Games
Competitors at the 2019 Southeast Asian Games
Southeast Asian Games gold medalists for Singapore
Southeast Asian Games silver medalists for Singapore
Southeast Asian Games bronze medalists for Singapore
Southeast Asian Games medalists in swimming
Asian Games competitors for Singapore
Swimmers at the 2018 Asian Games
Competitors at the 2021 Southeast Asian Games
21st-century Singaporean women